Babinek  (German Heinrichsdorf) is a village in the administrative district of Gmina Banie, within Gryfino County, West Pomeranian Voivodeship, in north-western Poland.

The settlement's German name indicates that the village was founded in the Middle Ages by German settlers.

History
The settlement's German name indicates that the village was founded in the Middle Ages by German settlers.

Before 1945 the area was part of Germany. For the history of the region, see History of Pomerania.

References

Babinek